Enrico Ruberti (1914–1985) was an Italian rower. He competed at the 1948 Summer Olympics in London with the men's eight where they were eliminated in the semi-final.

References

1914 births
1985 deaths
Italian male rowers
Olympic rowers of Italy
Rowers at the 1948 Summer Olympics
European Rowing Championships medalists